RadyoBisyon (RadioVision, portmanteau of Filipino words of "radio" and "television") is the Philippine national morning radio and television newscast that was produced by Media ng Bayan, aired on People's Television Network (PTV),  Intercontinental Broadcasting Corporation (IBC) and PBS-Radyo ng Bayan. It began airing on MNB's state-owned TV and radio stations on October 6, 2014, and is currently aired from 6:00 - 7:00 am PST on PTV with simulcast over IBC and DZRB Radyo ng Bayan.

PTV (formerly NBN), IBC and Radyo ng Bayan have earlier aired a joint venture morning show, One Morning Cafe, aired from 2007 - 2010; along with government owned Radio Philippines Network (RPN), now majority owned by ALC Group of Companies.

Cancellation
RadyoBisyon aired its final broadcast on June 2, 2017, as Radyo ng Bayan 738 was rebranded as Radyo Pilipinas 1 (RP1) on June 5, 2017.

Presenters
Aljo Bendijo (DZRB Radyo ng Bayan) (2016–2017)
Czarinah Lusuegro (DZRB Radyo ng Bayan) (2014–2015,  2016–2017)

Segments
 Words of Wisdom
 PTV News sa RadyoBisyon
 Provincial Round-up
 On the Road
 PTV InfoWeather
 Hapag ng Talastasan

Former Anchors
 Francis Cansino (DZRB Radyo ng Bayan) (2014–2016)
 Julius Disamburun (People's Television Network) (2014–2015)
 Vivienne Gulla (People's Television Network) (2014–2015) (now with ABS-CBN News Channel)
 Maria Arra Perez (People's Television Network) (2015–2016) (now with DZMM)
 Audrey Gorriceta (People's Television Network) (2016–2017)

See also
 List of programs aired by People's Television Network
 List of programs previously broadcast by Intercontinental Broadcasting Corporation

External links

People's Television Network original programming
Intercontinental Broadcasting Corporation original programming
Philippine television news shows
Breakfast television in the Philippines
Filipino-language television shows
2014 Philippine television series debuts
2017 Philippine television series endings
IBC News and Public Affairs shows
Intercontinental Broadcasting Corporation news shows
Simulcasts